The cephalic index or cranial index, the ratio of the maximum width (biparietal diameter or BPD, side to side) of the head of an organism multiplied by 100 and then divided by their maximum length (occipitofrontal diameter or OFD, front to back). The index was once used to categorize human beings in the first half of the 20th century, but today it is used to categorize dogs and cats.

Historic use in anthropology

Early anthropology

The cephalic index was used by anthropologists in the early 20th century as a tool categorize human populations. It was used to describe an individual's appearance and for estimating the age of fetuses for legal and obstetrical reasons.

The cephalic index was defined by Swedish professor of anatomy Anders Retzius (1796–1860) and first used in physical anthropology to classify ancient human remains found in Europe. The theory became closely associated with the development of racial anthropology in the 19th and early 20th centuries, when historians attempted to use ancient remains to model population movements in terms of racial categories. American anthropologist Carleton S. Coon also used the index in the 1960s, by which time it had been largely discredited.

In the cephalic index model, humans beings were characterized by having either a dolichocephalic (long-headed), mesaticephalic (moderate-headed), or brachycephalic (short-headed) cephalic index or cranial index.

Indices

Cephalic indices are grouped as in the following table:

Technically, the measured factors are defined as the maximum width of the bones that surround the head above the supramastoid crest (behind the cheekbones), and the maximum length from the most easily noticed part of the glabella (between the eyebrows) to the most easily noticed point on the back part of the head.

Controversy

The usefulness of the cephalic index was questioned by Giuseppe Sergi, who argued that cranial morphology provided a better means to model racial ancestry. Also, Franz Boas studied the children of immigrants to the United States in 1910 to 1912, noting that the children's cephalic index differed significantly from their parents', implying that local environmental conditions had a significant effect on the development of head shape.

Boas argued that if craniofacial features were so malleable in a single generation, then the cephalic index was of little use for defining race and mapping ancestral populations. Scholars such as Earnest A. Hooton continued to argue that both environment and heredity were involved. Boas did not himself claim it was totally plastic.

In 2002, a paper by Sparks and Jantz re-evaluated some of Boas's original data using new statistical techniques and concluded that there was a "relatively high genetic component" of head shape. Ralph Holloway of Columbia University argues that the new research raises questions about whether the variations in skull shape have "adaptive meaning and whether, in fact, normalizing selection might be at work on the trait, where both extremes, hyperdolichocephaly and hyperbrachycephaly, are at a slight selective disadvantage."

In 2003, anthropologists Clarence C. Gravlee, H. Russell Bernard, and William R. Leonard reanalyzed Boas's data and concluded that most of Boas's original findings were correct. Moreover, they applied new statistical, computer-assisted methods to Boas's data and discovered more evidence for cranial plasticity. In a later publication, Gravlee, Bernard and Leonard reviewed Sparks's and Jantz's analysis. They argue that Sparks and Jantz misrepresented Boas's claims, and that Sparks's and Jantz's data support Boas. For example, they point out that Sparks and Jantz look at changes in cranial size in relation to how long an individual has been in the United States in order to test the influence of the environment. Boas, however, looked at changes in cranial size in relation to how long the mother had been in the United States. They argue that Boas's method is more useful, because the prenatal environment is a crucial developmental factor.

Jantz and Sparks responded to Gravlee et al., reiterating that Boas' findings lacked biological meaning, and that the interpretation of Boas' results common in the literature was biologically inaccurate. In a later study, the same authors concluded that the effects Boas observed were likely the result of population-specific environmental effects such as changes in cultural practices for cradling infants, rather than the effects of a general "American environment" which caused populations in America to converge to a common cranial type, as Boas had suggested.

Modern use in animal breeding 
The cephalic index is used in the categorisation of animals, especially breeds of dogs and cats.

Brachycephalic animals

A brachycephalic skull is relatively broad and short (typically with the breadth at least 80% of the length). Dog breeds such as the pug are sometimes classified as "extreme brachycephalic". Because of the health issues brachycephaly is regarded as torture breeding as it often leads to the brachycephalic airway obstructive syndrome.

List of brachycephalic dogs

 Affenpinscher
 American Bulldog
 American Bully
 Boston Terrier
 Boxer
 Brussels Griffon
 Bulldog
 Bullmastiff
 Cane Corso
 Cavalier King Charles Spaniel
 Apple-headed Chihuahua
 Chow Chow
 Dogo Argentino
 Dogue de Bordeaux
 English Mastiff
 English Bulldog
 French Bulldog
 King Charles Spaniel
 Lhasa Apso
 Lowchen
 Neapolitan Mastiff
 Newfoundland
 Olde English Bulldogge
 Pekingese
 Perro de Presa Canario
 Pit bull
 Pug
 Shar-Pei
 Tibetan Spaniel
 Tosa

List of brachycephalic cats

 British Shorthair
 Burmese cat
 Exotic Shorthair
 Himalayan cat
 Persian cat
 Scottish Fold
 White tiger

List of brachycephalic pigs
 Middle White
 Neijiang

List of brachycephalic rabbits 
 Lionhead rabbit
 Lop rabbit
 Netherland Dwarf rabbit

Other
 Giant panda
 Ross seal
 Spectacled bear
 Walrus
 Wombat

Mesaticephalic animals

A mesaticephalic skull is of intermediate length and width. Mesaticephalic skulls are not markedly brachycephalic or dolichocephalic. When dealing with animals, especially dogs, the more appropriate and commonly used term is not "mesocephalic", but rather "mesaticephalic", which is a ratio of head to nasal cavity.  The breeds below exemplify this category.

List of mesaticephalic canines

 African Wild Dog
 Alaskan Malamute
 almost all spaniels
 almost all spitz, except for the Chow Chow
 American Eskimo Dog
 American Foxhound
 Australian Cattle Dog
 Australian Shepherd
 Basenji
 Beagle
 Bearded Collie
 Beauceron
 Belgian Malinois
 Belgian Sheepdog
 Bernese Mountain Dog
 Bichon Frisé
 Black and Tan Coonhound
 Border Collie
 Cardigan Welsh Corgi
 Chesapeake Bay Retriever
 pear- and deer-headed Chihuahuas
 Chinese Crested
 Chinook
 Curly-Coated Retriever
 Dalmatian
 Dhole
 English Foxhound
 Field Spaniel
 Finnish Lapphund
 Finnish Spitz
 Flat-Coated Retriever
 German Shorthaired Pointer
 German Wirehaired Pointer 
 German Spitz
 Golden Retriever
 Irish Setter
 Komondor
 Labrador Retriever
 Miniature Pinscher
 Pomeranian
 Poodle (Miniature and Toy)
 most terriers
 Mudi
 Pembroke Welsh Corgi
 Puli
 Rottweiler
 Samoyed
 Siberian Husky
 St. Bernard
 Vizsla
 Weimaraner
 Wirehaired Vizsla
 Xoloitzcuintle

List of mesaticephalic cats

Note: Almost all felines are mesaticephalic

 Abyssinian
 American Shorthair
 American Bobtail
 Bengal cat
 Birman
 Bombay cat
 Burmese cat
 Chartreux
 Chausie
 Colorpoint Shorthair
 Cymric cat
 Egyptian Mau
 Felid hybrids
 Felis, or small cats
 Maine Coon
 Manx
 Munchkin cat
 Norwegian forest cat 
 Ocicat
 Pallas's cat
 Ragdoll
 Russian Blue
 Russian White, Black and Tabby
 Selkirk Rex
 Siberian cat
 Somali
 Toyger
 Turkish Angora
 Turkish Van

List of mesaticephalic rabbits
 Dutch rabbit
 Mini Rex
 Polish rabbit
 New Zealand rabbit
 American Sable

Other
 Aardwolf
 Alligator
 American black bear
 Brown bear
 Brown hyena
 Fur seal
 Guinea pig
 Leopard seal
 Raccoon
 Sea lion
 Sloth bear
 Spotted hyena
 Striped hyena
 Sun bear
 Tasmanian devil

Dolichocephalic animals

A dolichocephalic skull is relatively long-headed (typically with the breadth less than 80% or 75% of the length).

List of dolichocephalic canids

 Afghan Hound
 Airedale Terrier
 Azawakh
 Basset Hound
 Bedlington Terrier
 Bloodhound
 Borzoi
 Bull terrier
 Cesky Terrier
 Coyote
 Dachshund
 Doberman Pinscher
 Dingo
 Fox Terrier
 Galgo Español
 German Shepherd Dog
 Great Dane
 Greyhound
 Irish Terrier
 Irish Wolfhound
 Italian Greyhound
 Kangaroo hound
 Kanni
 Kerry Blue Terrier
 Khalag Tazi
 Long dog
 Lurcher
 Manchester Terrier
 Miniature Bull Terrier
 Peruvian Inca Orchid
 Pharaoh Hound
 Poodle (Standard)
 Rampur Greyhound
 Red fox
 Rough Collie
 Russian Black Terrier
 Saluki
 Schnauzer
 Scottish Deerhound
 Scottish Terrier
 Sealyham Terrier
 Serbian Hound
 Shetland Sheepdog
 Silken Windhound
 Sloughi
 Smooth Collie
 Taigan
 Welsh Terrier
 Whippet
 Wolf

List of dolichocephalic felines

 Balinese
 Devon Rex
 Donskoy
 Jaguar
 Javanese
 Leopard
 Lion
 Ocelot
 Oriental Bicolor and Tricolor
 Oriental Longhair
 Oriental Shorthair
 Panthera hybrid
 Peterbald
 Sabertooth cats
 Savannah
 Siamese
 Snow leopard
 Sphynx
 Tiger

List of dolichocephalic leporids
English Spot
English Lop
Belgian Hare
All true hares

Other

 Bontebok
 Crocodile
 Domestic horse
 Donkey
 Gharial
 Grevy's zebra
 Hartebeest
 Hyrax
 Kangaroo
 Mule
 Onager
 Plains zebra
 Polar bear
 Thylacine
 Warthog
 Wild boar
 Wildebeest

See also 
 Cephalic index in cats and dogs
 Craniometry
 Phrenology
 Human skull

References

External links 

 Cephalic index
 Brachycephalic Experienced Veterinarians Database 

Biological anthropology